Moon's Milk (In Four Phases) Bonus Disc is a semi-official name for an edition of Coil CD-Rs released in conjunction with Moon's Milk (In Four Phases).

Release history
Each CD sleeve was hand painted and given its own unique title. Most of the sleeves were numbered, followed by the title, then "2001 ev.", "Winter Solstice - December 21, 2001 ev.", or something similar. Most of the titles have quotations around them. This official CD-R was originally available with a 'special edition' order of Moon's Milk (In Four Phases) which cost $85 more than the two cd set. Additional copies were made available later separately. The later ones were said to be the unnumbered ones that Jhonn Balance kept because he favored them. However, most of the later ones did not include a signed polaroid as the initial set did. The numbered edition is believed to be between 1 and three hundred, with repeating numbers. An approximate 33 of the 'Bonus Discs' comprise the unnumbered edition.

The song "The Coppice Meat" later appeared on a CD compilation titled X-Rated: The Dark Files.

This CD was going to be re-released on Moon's Milk In Six Phases.

Track listing
 "Copal" – 16:54
 "The Coppice Meat" – 10:49
 "Ü Pel (Incense Offering)" – 12:40

References

External links
 
 
 Moon's Milk (In Four Phases) Bonus Disc at Brainwashed

2001 albums
Coil (band) albums